The Murdocks are an American rock band consisting of three members and was formed in 2003 in Texas.

History
In 2003, The Murdocks formed in Austin, TX with Franklin Morris fulfilling vocal and guitar duties and Tim Dittmar and Robert Houghton fulfilling drum and bass duties respectively.

Since 2004, the band has undergone various lineup changes and has toured from coast to coast, playing over 200 shows and selling records through touring and a DIY ethos. Their first album was SurrenderEnder, released in 2005. The band debuted on the CMJ charts and climbed to #80. The band has played at various industry festivals, including South By Southwest, the CMJ Festival, and The Warped Tour.  In the last few years The Murdocks have done national tours.

The Roar! EP was released on April 1, 2008.  This EP was followed by the band's second album Distortionst, and was released on September 14, 2010.

In May 2020, the band released their third album III, which consisted of recordings the band made from 2015-2017.

Members
Franklin Morris - guitar, vocals
Kyle Robarge - bass guitar, backup vocals
David Jones - drums, backup vocals

Discography

Albums
SurrenderEnder (2005)
Distortionist (2010)III (2020) 

EPsMurdocks EP (2003)Roar! (2008)

CompilationsV/A-Ear Candy (2002)V/A - FROM TX TO BX (2006)

SinglesDa Da 7"'' (2004)

References

Sources
Electronic Press Kit
Review or Roar! EP, music.for-robots.com
Review of Roar! EP, rocksellout.com
Record Label biography
Includes information on chart placings on College Radio 
Press clipping from the Austin Chronicle
http://austinchronicle.com Texas Newspaper, covered Murdocks show with Cake

External links
Official band site

Alternative rock groups from Texas
Musical groups from Austin, Texas
Musical groups established in 2003
2003 establishments in Texas
American power pop groups